Cibdela is a genus of sawflies in the family Argidae.

Species
Cibdela chakrataensis   Saini & Thind 1989
Cibdela chinensis Rohwer, 1921
Cibdela choptaensis   Saini & Thind 1989
Cibdela dilate  (Wei, ????)
Cibdela flavipennis   Enderlein 1919
Cibdela hyalinia   Wei 2005
Cibdela janthina (Klug, 1834)
Cibdela maculipennis (Cameron 1899)
Cibdela melanomala  (Wei, 1999)
Cibdela melanoptera Rohwer, 1921
Cibdela poecilotricha  (Konow, 1898)
Cibdela ramgarhensis   Saini & Thind 1989
Cibdela scita  (Konow, 1900)
Cibdela smithi   Saini & Thind 1989
Cibdela zhejiangia  (Wei & Nie, 1998)

References
Konow, 1899. Einige neue Chalastogastra-Gattungen und Arten. - Entomologische Nachrichten 25:76 (on page 76)

Argidae